This is a list of Ukrainian football transfers in the winter transfer window 2011–12 by club. Only transfers of the Premier League are included.

Premier League

FC Arsenal Kyiv ( Leonid Kuchuk)

In:

Out:

FC Chornomorets Odessa ( Roman Hryhorchuk)

In:

Out:

FC Dnipro Dnipropetrovsk ( Juande Ramos)

In:

Out:

FC Dynamo Kyiv ( Yuri Semin)

In:

Out:

FC Illichivets Mariupol ( Ihor Leonov)

In:

Out:

FC Karpaty Lviv ( Volodymyr Sharan)

In:

Out:

FC Kryvbas Kryvyi Rih ( Yuriy Maksymov)

In:

Out:

FC Metalist Kharkiv ( Myron Markevych)

In:

Out:

FC Metalurh Donetsk ( Volodymyr Pyatenko)

In:

Out:

FC Obolon Kyiv ( Serhiy Konyushenko)

In:

Out:

PFC Oleksandriya ( Leonid Buryak)

In:

Out:

FC Shakhtar Donetsk ( Mircea Lucescu)

In:

Out:

SC Tavriya Simferopol ( Semen Altman)

In:

Out:

FC Volyn Lutsk ( Anatoliy Demyanenko)

In:

Out:

FC Vorskla Poltava ( Mykola Pavlov)

In:

Out:

FC Zorya Luhansk ( Yuriy Vernydub)

In:

Out:

See also
2011-12 Ukrainian Premier League

References

External links
 Ukrainian Football Premier League- official site
 Professional football league of Ukraine - official site
 Football Federation of Ukraine - official site
Ukrainian Soccer Fan Club (ukrainiansoccer.net) - amateur's site
 Премьер-лига. Трансферная зима-2011/2012 (Premier-league. Transfer winter 2011/12)

Ukrainian
Transfers
2011-12